The 2007 Australian Production Car Championship was a CAMS sanctioned Australian motor racing title open to Group 3E Series Production Cars. The championship, which was administered by the Production Car Association of Australia, was promoted as the Shannons Australian Production Car Championship. It was the 14th Australian Production Car Championship.

The championship was won Garry Holt  driving a BMW 335i. It was the second national title in as many years for Holt who had previously won the 2006 Australian Performance Car Championship. Holt finished 50 points clear of his team-mate Barry Morcom, also driving a BMW 335i. Morcom won a season long battle with Holden Commodore driver Steve Briffa for the runner-up position in the championship.

Calendar
The championship was contested over an eight round series.

Class Structure
Cars competed in five classes: 
 Class SP – for "Super Production" Cars 
 Class A – for V8 and turbocharged six cylinder cars
 Class B – for medium cars including high performance fours and smaller turbocharged cars
 Class C – for small cars
 Class D – for diesel engined cars

Additional entries, competing without a Production Car Association License Agreement, contested two Trophy classes, “SP Trophy”, (for cars in Super
Production) and “Trophy” (for cars in Classes A, B or C). Drivers of SP Trophy and Trophy class cars were not eligible to score championship points.

Points system
Championship points for both outright and classes were awarded on a 30-25-22-20-18-16-14-12-10-8-6-4-2-1 basis for the first 14 finishers in each race. One point was awarded to all other finishers. Bonus points were also awarded at Round 1 according to the outright finishing order of competitors that were registered for the championship.

The fastest qualifying driver in each Class of the qualifying session was awarded 3 points towards their class points score.

To be eligible to score points at any rounds of the championship the driver was required to be a current financial member of the Production Car Association of Australia.
	
Any seven rounds were counted towards the championship.	
	
Drivers registered as Trophy competitors were not eligible to score championship points, but competed for two separate Trophy class awards. Points towards the two season class awards were allocated on a 5-4-6-2-1- basis for the first five positions in each class at each race, with one point given to each of the other finishers.

Results

Outright

Classes

References

Australian Production Car Championship
Production Car Championship